William McNulty may refer to:

 Billy McNulty (born 1949), Scottish former football goalkeeper
 William McNulty (Relief organization founder), founder of Team Rubicon
 William Charles McNulty (1889–1963), American artist,
 William N. McNulty (1829–1922), American Roman Catholic priest
 William A. McNulty, U.S. Army officer